Behemoth is a 2011 American film. It is the 22nd film of the Maneater Series. It was premiered January 15, 2011, on Syfy.

Plot 
Two military agents are taking readings on Mount Lincoln near the town of Ascension. There is a quake and the woman, Agent O'Neil, dies with marks on her face. The man, Agent McKewan, also dies after being crushed. Elsewhere, a man is injured in a work crew and dies for no apparent reason. It later appears the quakes on the mountain are producing a layer of carbon dioxide gas, suffocating those who descend to its altitude. A woman named Emily, studying Mt. Lincoln, visits the mountain to repair two machines.

In the adjacent town, an old man named William is considered an eccentric for believing that the mountain contains Behemoth. Emily meets with William's son and her old friend, Thomas. Satellite images show movement under the mountain, which they attribute to volcanism. Thomas's sister Grace and her boyfriend ascend the mountain, and Thomas is persuaded to go as guide to government agent Jack Murray. They meet Emily, who is running because part of a mountain suddenly exploded; whereas Grace and her boyfriend are startled by a monstrous eye and accompanying tentacle.

After she and Thomas have discovered Agent O'Neil's body, Emily has persuaded the Sheriff to evacuate the town, but Thomas and Emily ascend the mountain to look for the missing couple. They find Jack injured on the mountain, and Behemoth kills Jack immediately after revelation that the troubles at Mt. Lincoln were felt all over the world six months ago, and a missing box may be their only chance against Behemoth (lost when the agents were killed). William goes to the local diner to get the waitress, Zoe, to safety.

However, an earthquake damages the town, and the diner sinks into the ground with William and Zoe still inside. The box is recovered; but the monster consumes the boyfriend, while Thomas pulls Grace to safety. Behemoth then emerges from the mountain, whereupon Thomas opens the box and fires a shoulder-launched missile into Behemoth's throat, destroying it. William and Zoe escape from the diner in a sinkhole, and all five survivors are reunited.

Cast

Reception

Digital Retribution panned the film, criticizing the film's uninteresting characters, dialogue, and lack of screen time of the title monster.

Home media
Behemoth was released on DVD on April 5, 2011, by RHI Entertainment. It was re-released as a part of a 3-disc set which included the complete Maneater series.

References

External links
 
 

American horror television films
Canadian horror television films
2011 television films
2011 films
Maneater (film series)
Syfy original films
2010s monster movies
Films shot in British Columbia
CineTel Films films
2010s English-language films
Films directed by W. D. Hogan
2010s American films
2010s Canadian films